Mountain View High School is a junior college providing Nursery to Degree classes located in Chikmagalur, Karnataka in India.

History 
Mountain view School is located in a valley, between the beautiful hills of [Chikmagalur] 6 km away from the main town. The school was founded by Mrs. Azra to provide education in a school based on meritocracy, on a par with international standards.

There is a section for children with special needs.

The school completed its golden jubilee celebrations on 19th jan 2012.

Clubs and extracurricular activities
The school has playing and practising grounds for sports and a stadium for indoor games.
There are also skating ring, vast grounds, indoor stadium, an indoor auditorium, open auditorium, canteen, a couple of libraries etc.

References

External links 
 www.mvei.in

Schools in Chikkamagaluru district
Educational institutions established in 1962
High schools and secondary schools in Karnataka